Veronica vernicosa, the varnished hebe, is a species of flowering plant in the family Plantaginaceae, native to the South Island of New Zealand. As its synonym Hebe vernicosa, it and its cultivar 'Mrs Winder' have both gained the Royal Horticultural Society's Award of Garden Merit.

References

vernicosa
Endemic flora of New Zealand
Flora of the South Island
Plants described in 1864